In Judaism, the , also spelled  or , is any of a variety of sacrificial offerings described and commanded in the Torah.

The term  primarily refers to sacrificial offerings given from humans to God for the purpose of doing homage, winning favor, or securing pardon. The object sacrificed was usually an animal that was ritually slaughtered and then transferred from the human to the divine realm by being burned on an altar.

After the destruction of the Second Temple, sacrifices were prohibited because there was no longer a Temple, the only place allowed by halakha for sacrifices. Offering of sacrifices was briefly reinstated during the Jewish–Roman wars of the second century AD and was continued in certain communities thereafter.

When sacrifices were offered in ancient times, they were offered as a fulfillment of Biblical commandments. Since there is no longer a Temple, modern religious Jews instead pray or give  to atone for their sins as the  would have accomplished. According to Orthodox Judaism, the coming of the messiah will not remove the requirement to keep the 613 commandments, and when the Temple is rebuilt, sacrifices will be offered again.

Etymology

and 
The Semitic root  means  and is found in a number of related languages in addition to Hebrew, e.g. in the Akkadian language noun , meaning . The feminine noun  (plural) first occurs in the Bible in Leviticus 1:2 and occurs 80 times in the Masoretic Text; 40 times in Leviticus, 38 in Numbers and twice in Ezekiel. The related form  appears only in the Book of Nehemiah 10:35 and Nehemiah 13:31, meaning . The etymology of the 'offer' sense is traditionally understood as deriving from the verbal sense of 'bringing near', viz. bringing the offering near to the deity, but some theological explanations see it rather as bringing "man back to God".

By the Second Temple period, Hellenistic Jewish texts use korban specifically to mean a vow. Josephus also generally uses other words for 'offering' but uses  for the vow of the Nazirites (Antiquities of the Jews 4:73 / 4,4,4) and cites Theophrastus as having cited a korban vow among the Tyrians (Against Apion 1.167 / 1,22,4).

Purpose
The idea conveyed in most  was that of a "gift" to God.

Besides this one exception, there were the overwhelming majority of other purposes for bringing , and the expiatory effect is often incidental, and is subject to significant limitations.  are brought purely for the purpose of communing with God and becoming closer to him. They were also brought for the purpose of expressing thanks, gratitude, and love to God.

Sins in Judaism consist of different grades of severity:

These three terms are mentioned in the Book of Psalms: "We have sinned [],[...] we have committed iniquity [], we have done wickedly []".

With few exceptions,  could only be used as a means of atoning for the first type of sin, that is sins committed in ignorance that the thing was a sin. In addition,  have no expiating effect unless the person making the offering sincerely repents their actions before making the offering, and makes restitution to any person who was harmed by the violation.

Hebrew Bible

Offerings are mentioned in the Book of Genesis, but further outlined in the later four books of the Torah, including aspects of their origins and history.

The Hebrew Bible says that God commanded the Israelites to offer offerings and sacrifices on various altars. Before building the Temple in Jerusalem, when the Israelites were in the desert, sacrifices were only to be offered in the Tabernacle. After the invasion of Canaan, the main sacrificial centre was at Shiloh, though sacrifice also took place at Beit Shemesh, Mizpah, Ramah, and Gilgal, while family and clan sacrifices were commonplace Under Saul the main center of sacrifice was Nob, though private offerings continued to be made at Shiloh. David created a new sacrificial center in Jerusalem at the threshing floor of Araunaḥ, to which he moved the Ark. According to the Hebrew Bible, after the building of Solomon's Temple, sacrifices were only to be carried out there. After Solomon's Temple was destroyed, sacrifices were resumed when the Second Temple was built until it was also destroyed in 70 CE.

Every regular weekday, Sabbath, and many Jewish holidays had their own unique offerings.

The priests performed the offerings first in the ancient tabernacle and then in the Temple. The High Priest of Israel played a crucial role in this regard on Yom Kippur, a day when multiple offerings were offered.

Women and offerings
Women were required to perform a number of offerings, including:
 The offerings following childbirth as described in the Book of Leviticus, 12.
 Thank offering and its accompanying meal offering following recovery from illness or danger.
 The Passover sacrifice on Passover. Women could offer the sacrifice and hold a Passover Seder themselves if they wished, even if married.
 Sin offerings or guilt offerings in atonement for transgressions and unintentional errors.
The offering for an accused adulterous wife in the ordeal of the bitter water
 Offerings relevant to fulfillment of, or transgression of, the Nazirite vow.
 Offerings following cure from certain diseases and unusual bodily discharges.

Women could also voluntarily participate in a number of other offerings and rituals for which they were not obligated, including:
 First Fruits on the holiday of Shavuot.
 Temple tax – The half-shekel tax for Temple needs.
 Voluntary offerings, peace offerings and a variety of other voluntary and donative offerings.
  (laying on hands) of sacrificial animals for sacrifices they were not required to perform (Berachot 19a).
 Women could slaughter their sacrificial animals themselves if they wished.

In the Nevi'im
Many books of the Nevi'im section of the Hebrew Bible such as the Book of Isaiah and Book of Jeremiah spoke out against those Israelites who brought forth sacrifices but did not act in accord with the precepts of the Law. The Prophets disparaged sacrifices that were offered without a regeneration of the heart, i.e., a determined turning from sin and returning to God by striving after righteousness (Book of Hosea 14:1-2, Joel 2:13, Micah 6:6-8). At the same time, prophets stressed the importance of offerings combined with justice and good even as they taught that offerings were unacceptable unless combined with heartfelt repentance and good deeds. Malachi, the last prophet in the Hebrew Bible, emphasized that the goal of repentance is not to end sacrifices, but to make the offerings fit for acceptance once again (Book of Malachi, 3:3-4). Similarly, the Book of Isaiah despite disparagement of sacrifices without justice, portrays sacrifice as having a role complementary with prayer in a universalistic eschatology (Isaiah 56:1; 6–7).

Rabbinical interpretation

100 among the 613 commandments
According to Maimonides, about one hundred of the permanent 613 commandments based on the Torah, by rabbinical enumeration, directly concern sacrifices, excluding those commandments that concern the actual Temple and the priests themselves of which there are about another fifty.

Instructions in Mishnah and Talmud

The Talmud provides extensive details not only on how to perform sacrifices but how to adjudicate difficult cases, such what to do if a mistake was made and whether improperly performing one of the required ritual elements invalidates it or not. The Talmud explains how to roast the Passover offering, how to dash blood from different kinds of sacrifices upon the altar, how to prepare the incense, the regulatory code for the system of taxation that financed the priesthood and public sacrifices, and numerous other details.

Rationale and rabbinic commentary
Maimonides, a medieval Jewish scholar, drew on the early critiques of the need for sacrifice, taking the view that God always held sacrifice inferior to prayer and philosophical meditation. However, God understood that the Israelites were used to the animal sacrifices that the surrounding pagan tribes used as the primary way to commune with their gods. As such, in Maimonides' view, it was only natural that Israelites would believe that sacrifice would be a necessary part of the relationship between God and man. This view is controversial since the Torah also forbids worship of foreign idols and practices of pagan religions as "detestable" before God including their sacrifices. Maimonides concludes that God's decision to allow sacrifices was a concession to human psychological limitations. It would have been too much to have expected the Israelites to leap from pagan worship to prayer and meditation in one step. In The Guide for the Perplexed, he writes:

In contrast, many others such as Nahmanides (in his commentary on Leviticus 1:9) disagreed. Nahmanides cites the fact that the Torah records the practices of animal and other sacrifices from the times of Abraham, Isaac, and Jacob and earlier. Indeed, the purpose of recounting the near sacrifice of Isaac was to illustrate the sublime significance and need of animal sacrifices as supplanting the abomination of human sacrifices.

Abraham built a number of altars; the text does not mention that he sacrificed animals on them but only that he "called out in the name of God". This has been interpreted as a theological statement that God does not need animal sacrifices.

In spiritual practice
The  also has a spiritual meaning and refers to some part of an individual's ego, which is given up as a sacrifice to God in honouring the mortality of the worshipper. In keeping with the root of the word, meaning to draw close, and to the common usage as the sacrifice of an animal, so can the worshipper sacrifice something of this world to become closer to God.

The end of sacrifices
With the destruction of the Second Temple in Jerusalem by the Romans, the Jewish practice of offering  stopped for all intents and purposes. Despite subsequent intermittent periods of small Jewish groups offering the traditional sacrifices on the Temple Mount, the practice effectively ended.

Rabbinic Judaism was forced to undergo a significant development in response to this change; no longer could Judaism revolve around the Temple services. The destruction of the Temple led to a development of Judaism in the direction of text study, prayer, and personal observance. Orthodox Judaism regards this as being largely an alternative way of fulfilling the obligations of the Temple. Other branches of Judaism (Conservative, Reform, and Reconstructionist) regard the korbanot as an ancient ritual that will not return. A range of responses is recorded in classical rabbinic literature, describing this subject:

In the Babylonian Talmud, a number of sages opined that following Jewish law, doing charitable deeds, and studying Jewish texts is greater than performing animal sacrifices:

Nonetheless, numerous texts of the Talmud stress the importance of and hope for eventual re-introduction of sacrifices and regard their loss as a tragedy. Partaking of sacrificial offerings was compared to eating directly at one's Father's table, whose loss synagogue worship does not entirely replace. One example is in :

Another example is in :

Liturgical attention to end of sacrifices

Numerous details of the daily religious practice of an ordinary Jew are connected to keeping memory of the rhythm of the life of the Temple and its sacrifices. A detailed discussion of the obligations of tithing, ritual purity, and other elements central to the Temple and priesthood is required in order to determine the meaning of this contemporary daily Jewish obligation.

Other occasions
Jewish services for Shabbat, Jewish holidays and other occasions include special prayers for the restoration of sacrifices. For example, the traditional Yom Kippur liturgy contains repeated prayers for the restoration of sacrifices and every High Holiday Amidah contains Isaiah 56:7:

Modern view and resumption of sacrifices

Future of sacrifices in Judaism

The prevailing belief among rabbinic Jews is that in the messianic era, the Messiah will come, and a Third Temple will be built. It is believed that the  will be reinstituted, but to what extent and for how long is unknown. Some biblical and classical rabbinic sources hold that most or all sacrifices will not need to be offered:

 "In the future all sacrifices, with the exception of the Thanksgiving-sacrifice, will be discontinued." (Midrash Vayikra Rabbah 9:7)
 "All sacrifices will be annulled in the future." (Tanchuma Emor 14, Vayikra Rabbah 9:7)
 "Then the grain-offering of Judah and Jerusalem will be pleasing to God as in the days of old, and as in ancient years." (Malachi 3:4)
 "It is impossible to go suddenly from one extreme to the other;[...] the custom which was in those days general among all men, and the general mode of worship in which the Israelites were brought up consisted of sacrificing animals in the temples... For this reason God allowed this kind of service to continue. The sacrificial system is not the primary object, rather supplications, and prayer." (Maimonides, The Guide to the Perplexed III 32)

The majority view of classical rabbis is that the Torah's commandments will still be applicable and in force during the messianic era. However, a significant minority of rabbis held that most of the commandments would be nullified in the messianic age, thus keeping that sacrifices will not be reinstated. Examples of such rabbinic views include:
 Babylonian Talmud, Tractate Niddah 61b and Tractate Shabbat 151b.
 Midrash Shochar Tov (Mizmor 146:5) states that God will permit what is now forbidden.

Orthodox Judaism holds that in the messianic era, most or all of the korbanot will be reinstituted, at least for a time. Conservative Judaism and Reform Judaism, hold that no animal sacrifices will be offered in a rebuilt Temple at all, following the position of Tanchuma Emor 14 and Vayikra Rabbah 9:7.

19th and 20th century

In the 1800s a number of Orthodox rabbis studied the idea of reinstating  on the Temple Mount, even though the messianic era had not yet arrived and the Temple was not rebuilt. A number of responsa concluded that within certain parameters, it is permissible according to Jewish law to offer such sacrifices.

During the early 20th century, Israel Meir Kagan advised some followers to set up special yeshivas for married students known as  that would specialize in the study of the korbanot and study with greater intensity the  sections of the Talmud in order to prepare for the arrival of the Jewish Messiah who would oversee the rebuilding of the original Temple of Solomon in Jerusalem that would be known as the Third Temple.

Efforts to restore 

A few groups, notably the Temple Institute and the Temple Mount Faithful, have petitioned the Israeli government to rebuild a Third Temple on the Temple Mount and restore sacrificial worship. The Israeli government has not responded favorably. Most Orthodox Jews regard rebuilding a Temple as an activity for a Jewish Messiah as part of a future Jewish eschatology, and most non-Orthodox Jews do not believe in the restoration of sacrificial worship at all. The Temple Institute has been constructing ritual objects in preparation for a resumption of sacrifices.

View among modern Jewish denominations

Contemporary Orthodox Judaism
They are also referred to in the prayerbooks of Conservative Judaism, in an abbreviated fashion.

References to sacrifices in the Orthodox prayer service include:
  (see section below) – a section of the morning prayer service devoted to readings related to the sacrifices.
  – Every the Orthodox , the central prayer of Jewish services, contains the paragraph: "Be favorable, Oh Lord our God, to your people Israel and their prayer, and restore the service of the Holy of Holies of Your House, and accept the fire-offerings of Israel and their prayer with love and favor, and may the service of your people Israel always be favored." Conservative Judaism removes the fire-offerings clause from this prayer.
  – Private recitation of the  traditionally ends with the  prayer for the restoration of the Temple.
 After the weekday Torah reading, a prayer is recited for the restoration of the Temple: "May it be the will before our Father who is in heaven to establish the House of our lives and to return his  into our midst, speedily, in our days, and let us say Amen."
 On each Jewish holiday, the sections in the Torah mentioning that festival's  is read out loud in synagogue.

In Conservative Judaism
Consistent with its stress on the continuity of tradition, many Conservative synagogues have also retained references to Shabbat and Festival , changing all references to sacrifices into the past tense (e.g. the Orthodox "and there we will sacrifice" is changed to "and there they sacrificed"). Some more liberal Conservative synagogues, however, have removed all references to sacrifices, past or present, from the prayer service. The most recent official Conservative prayer book, Sim Shalom, provides both service alternatives.

In Reform and Reconstructionist Judaism

The  section of prayer
A section of the morning daily  prayer is called , and is mostly devoted to recitation of legal passages relating to the sacrifices.

In the Nusach Ashkenaz custom, this section includes the following:
  – Perpetual daily offerings: "...Fire-offering...male yearling lambs unblemished two a day..." based on Numbers 28:1–8.
  – The additional offerings for Shabbat: "On the Sabbath...two male lambs...fine flour for a meal offering mixed with oil and its wine libation..." based on Numbers 28:9–10.
  – Offering for the new month: ...Two young bulls, one ram, seven lambs...fine flour ...mixed with olive oil...one he goat... and its wine libation." Based on Numbers 28:11–15.
 Chapter 5 of Mishnah  is then read. This chapter provides a concise overview of all the sacrifices and many of their laws.
  – Rabbi Yishmael says: "Through thirteen rules is the Torah elucidated."
  (Ending) – The study session concludes with a prayer ("May it be thy will...) for the restoration of the Temple in Jerusalem and the resumption of sacrifices. ("...that the Temple be rebuilt speedily in our days, and grant our portion in your Torah and there we shall serve you with reverence as in days of old and in former years. And may the grain offering of Judah and Jerusalem be pleasing to God, as in days of old and in former years.")

In a later period, some communities began to add the following (all or some of the paragraphs):
  (Incense offering): Based on Exodus 30:34 and Exodus 36:7–8}}, as well as a rabbinic text derived from Babylonian Talmud  6a; Jerusalem Talmud  4:5; 33a.

See also

Notes

References

Bibliography
 Bleich, J. David. "A Review of Halakhic Literature Pertaining to the Reinstitution of the Sacrificial Order." Tradition 9 (1967): 103–24.
 Myers, Jody Elizabeth. "Attitudes Towards a Resumption of Sacrificial Worship in the Nineteenth Century." Modern Judaism 7, no. 1 (1987): 29–49.
 Ticker, Jay. The Centrality of Sacrifices as an Answer to Reform in the Thought of Zvi Hirsch Kalischer. Vol. 15, Working Papers in Yiddish and East European Studies, 1975

External links
 Jewish Encyclopedia.com comprehensive article on the sacrifices
 Sacrifice Handbook: detailed descriptions of the Torah's system of Korbanot 
 Topical index of Talmud passages on Temple sacrifices

Tabernacle and Temples in Jerusalem
 
Siddur of Orthodox Judaism
Shacharit